Thomas Harold Hunt Craxton  (30 April 188530 March 1971) was an English pianist, teacher and composer.

Born in London, and growing up in Devizes, Craxton began studying piano with Tobias Matthay and Cuthbert Whitemore in 1907, and made a name for himself early in his career as an accompanist, touring for two years with Emma Albani and twelve with Clara Butt, covering Europe, South Africa, America, Canada, the South Sea Islands, Australia and New Zealand.  He also had long associations with Nellie Melba, Lionel Tertis, Jacques Thibaud, Elena Gerhardt and John McCormack.

In 1919 he became a professor at the Royal Academy of Music.  He remained there until 1961, although he continued teaching from his studio long into his later years. Some notable students included Winifred Atwell, Joyce Howard Barrell, Susan Bradshaw, Howard Brown, Elaine Hugh-Jones, Alexander Kelly, Denis Matthews, Noel Mewton-Wood, Albert Alan Owen, Peter Katin, and Alan Richardson.

Craxton was also an active composer.  His first published work was "Three Pieces for Pianoforte" (1911). Some of his songs were recorded by John McCormack and Lauritz Melchior. He also collected musical compositions in association with Alfred Edward Moffat. Working with Donald Tovey between 1926-1931 he completed an edition of the complete Beethoven piano sonatas which was published by the Associated Board of the Royal Schools of Music and has remained in print ever since.

Craxton and his wife Essie had one daughter and five sons, including the artist John Craxton, the BBC Television producer Anthony Craxton and the distinguished oboist Janet Craxton.

References

External links 
 Craxton Memorial Trust
 Christopher Howell: Remembering Harold Craxton
 Obituary of his second son Anthony.

1885 births
1971 deaths
Academics of the Royal Academy of Music
Piano pedagogues
Pupils of Tobias Matthay
English classical pianists
Male classical pianists
English composers
20th-century classical pianists
20th-century British male musicians
Presidents of the Independent Society of Musicians